WPVQ may refer to:

 WPVQ-FM, a radio station (95.3 FM) licensed to serve Greenfield, Massachusetts, United States
 WQVD, a radio station (700 AM) licensed to serve Orange-Athol, Massachusetts, United States, which held the call sign WPVQ from 2019 to 2023
 WRSI, a radio station (93.9 FM) licensed to serve Turners Falls, United States, which held the call sign WPVQ from 1993 to 2001
 the ICAO code for Viqueque Airport in Viqueque, East Timor